Dasmariñas is a component city in the Philippines.

Dasmariñas or Dasmarinas may also refer to:

Places
 Dasmarinas Estates, Alberta, a community in Strathcona County, Alberta
 Dasmariñas Bagong Bayan, a resettlement area located in Dasmariñas, Philippines
 Dasmariñas Village in Makati, Philippines
 De La Salle University-Dasmariñas, in Dasmariñas, Philippines
 Legislative district of Dasmariñas, the 4th legislative district of Cavite, Philippines
 Dasmariñas, Makati, a barangay in Makati, Philippines

People
 Gómez Pérez Dasmariñas, the 8th Spanish Governor-General of the Philippines
 Luis Pérez Dasmariñas, the 9th Spanish Governor-General of the Philippines
 Michael Dasmariñas (born 1992), professional boxer